McKeesport National Bank (now McKeesport City Hall) located at 5th Avenue and Sinclair Street in McKeesport, Pennsylvania, was built from 1889 to 1891.  It was added to the National Register of Historic Places on August 29, 1980, and the List of Pittsburgh History and Landmarks Foundation Historic Landmarks in 1981.

References

Bank buildings on the National Register of Historic Places in Pennsylvania
Buildings and structures in Allegheny County, Pennsylvania
Commercial buildings completed in 1891
Romanesque Revival architecture in Pennsylvania
Pittsburgh History & Landmarks Foundation Historic Landmarks
National Register of Historic Places in Allegheny County, Pennsylvania